Birkenhead East was a parliamentary constituency centred on the Birkenhead area of Merseyside.  It returned one Member of Parliament (MP)  to the House of Commons of the Parliament of the United Kingdom, elected by the first past the post voting system.

History
The constituency was created by the Representation of the People Act 1918 for the 1918 general election when the Parliamentary Borough of Birkenhead was split between the East and West Divisions.

It was abolished by the Representation of the People Act 1948 for the 1950 general election.

Boundaries
The County Borough of Birkenhead wards of Argyle, Bebington, Clifton, Egerton, and Mersey, and the part of the borough which lay between the eastern boundary of Argyle, Mersey and Bebington wards and the centre of the bed of the River Mersey.

On abolition, southern parts (Bebington, Egerton and Mersea wards) were include in the new constituency of Bebington, and northern parts (Argyle and Clifton wards) were included in the reconstituted constituency of Birkenhead.

Members of Parliament

Election results

Election in the 1910s

Election in the 1920s

Election in the 1930s

Conservative candidate Walter Fletcher withdrew 17 days before polling day

Election in the 1940s

See also

 History of parliamentary constituencies and boundaries in Cheshire

References

 
 

Parliamentary constituencies in North West England (historic)
Constituencies of the Parliament of the United Kingdom established in 1918
Constituencies of the Parliament of the United Kingdom disestablished in 1950
Birkenhead